The Display Stakes is a Thoroughbred horse race run annually at Woodbine Racetrack in Toronto, Ontario, Canada. Contested on a synthetic "all weather" surface over a distance of  miles (8.5 furlongs), it is open to two-year-old horses. Raced during the latter part of November or early December, the ungraded stakes race offers a purse of Can$125,000.

Inaugurated in 1956 at Toronto's Old Woodbine Race Course as a sprint race, it was named for American Walter J. Salmon's colt Display,  winner of the 1926 Preakness Stakes and who frequently raced in Canada where he won a number of important races.

The Display stakes was run in two divisions in 1959. There was no race in 1993. Since inception, it has been contested at various distances:
6 furlongs: 1956 at Old Woodbine Race Course
7 furlongs: 1957–1958 at Old Woodbine Race Course
8 furlongs (1 mile): 1959-1960 Old Woodbine Race Course, 1977–1992 at Greenwood Raceway
8.5 furlongs ( miles): 1969–1976 at Greenwood Raceway, 1994 to present at Woodbine Racetrack
9 furlongs ( miles): 1961–1963 at Old Woodbine Race Course
9.5 furlongs: 1964–1968 at Greenwood Raceway

Records
Speed  record: 
 1:43.04 - Gigawatt (2002)

Most wins by an owner:
 4 - Stafford Farms (1962, 1967, 1972, 1978)

Most wins by a jockey:
 4 - Patrick Husbands (1999, 2002, 2005, 2010)
 4 - Luis Contreras (2011, 2012, 2014, 2017)

Most wins by a trainer:
 5 - Mark E. Casse (1999, 2002, 2005, 2016, 2018)

Winners of the Display Stakes

References

 The Display Stakes at Pedigree Query

Ungraded stakes races in Canada
Flat horse races for two-year-olds
Recurring sporting events established in 1956
Woodbine Racetrack